The Cerna (also: Cerna Hunedoreană or Cerna Ardeleană) is a left tributary of the river Mureș in Transylvania, Romania. Its name both in Romanian and Hungarian languages originates from a Slav language, meaning "black (water)". Its source is in the Poiana Ruscă Mountains. It flows through the town Hunedoara and the villages Gura Bordului, Lunca Cernii de Sus, Lunca Cernii de Jos, Hășdău,  Dăbâca, Toplița, Cinciș-Cerna, Teliucu Superior, Teliucu Inferior, Peștișu Mare and Sântandrei. It discharges into the Mureș in Sântuhalm near Deva.

Tributaries
The following rivers are tributaries to the river Cerna (from source to mouth):

Left: Bordul, Ireanc, Sălicea, Bunila, Vălărița, Govăjdia, Zlaști, Peștiș, Cristur, Valea Ursului
Right: Cernușorița, Negoi, Hășdău, Lingina, Valea Boții

References

Rivers of Romania
Rivers of Hunedoara County
Hunedoara